The Mughal Empire was an early modern empire that dominated Indian subcontinent between 1526 and 1857 and fought a series of wars with neighbouring empires and kingdoms. The following is a list of wars involving the Mughal empire:

List
Mughal–Rajput Wars (1526–1779)
Mughal–Persian Wars (1605–1739)
Mughal–Ahom Wars (1616–1682)
Mughal–Sikh Wars (1621–1783)
Mughal–Tibet Wars (1679–1684)
Mughal–Maratha Wars (1680–1707)
Mughal–East India Company Wars (1686–1857)
Mughal Civil Wars  (1627–1720)

See also
List of battles involving the Mughal Empire

 
Mughal Empire